Mayo River State Park may refer to:
Mayo River State Park (North Carolina)
Mayo River State Park (Virginia)